Anisophyllea globosa is a tree of Borneo in the family Anisophylleaceae. The specific epithet  is from the Latin meaning "round", referring to the fruits.

Description
The bark is smooth.

Distribution and habitat
Anisophyllea globosa is endemic to Borneo, where it is likely confined to Sabah. Its habitat is lowland secondary vegetation at around  altitude.

References

globosa
Trees of Borneo
Endemic flora of Borneo
Plants described in 1993
Taxonomy articles created by Polbot
Flora of the Borneo lowland rain forests